Michael Jackson's Ghosts is a 1996 short film starring Michael Jackson, directed by Stan Winston, and written by Stephen King and Mick Garris. It is based on a story by Garris, Jackson and King.

Ghosts tells the story of an eccentric man with supernatural powers being forced out of a small town by its judgmental mayor. Jackson plays five roles, and performs dance routines set to the songs "2 Bad", "Is It Scary" and "Ghosts", taken from his albums HIStory (1995) and Blood on the Dance Floor: HIStory in the Mix (1997).

Ghosts was filmed and released in 1996 and released along with select prints of the horror film Thinner, and was first screened in the 1997 Cannes Film Festival. It was released as promo a year later internationally on LaserDisc, VHS and Video CD.

Plot
The mayor of Normal Valley leads a mob to the mansion of the Maestro, who has been entertaining local children with magic tricks and ghost stories. The children assure the parents the Maestro has done nothing wrong, but the mayor intends to banish him as a "freak".

The Maestro challenges the mayor to a "scaring contest": the first to become scared must leave. He performs magic tricks and dance routines with a ghostly horde, then possesses the mayor, forcing him to dance. After the performance, the Maestro agrees to leave and crumbles to dust, but returns as an enormous ghoul. Terrified, the mayor leaps through the window. The families agree that they had fun and allow the Maestro to stay.

Production
Ghosts began production in 1993 under the title Is it Scary? with the director Mick Garris, planned for release in conjunction with the family comedy film Addams Family Values. Following contract disputes, the Addams Family connection was dropped. Stan Winston, who was previously in charge of makeup and visual effects, took over as director when Garris left to make the Shining miniseries. According to Garris, Ghosts was the most expensive music video ever made, at around $15 million dollars, all paid for by Jackson.

Cast
 Michael Jackson as Maestro / Mayor / Mayor Ghoul / Superghoul / Skeleton
 Pat Dade as Pat
 Amy Smallman as Amy
 Edwina Moore as Edwina
 Dante Beze as Dante
 Seth Smith as Seth
 Kendall Cunningham as Kendall
 Loren Randolph as Loren
 Heather Ehlers as Heather

Choreographers

 Michael Jackson
 LaVelle Smith Jr.
 Travis Payne
 Barry Lather

Dancers

 Michael Balderrama
 Troy Burgess
 John "Havic" Gregory
 M.G. Gong
 Heather Harley
 Paula Harrison
 Shawnette Heard
 Cris Judd
 Richard Kim
 Dorie Konno
 Kelly Konno
 Suzi McDonald
 Courtney Miller, Jr
 Nikki Pantenburg
 Travis Payne
 Mia Pitts
 Charlie E. Schmidt
 Joie Shettler
 Yuko Sumida 
 Anthony Talauega
 Richmond Talauega
 Lisa Joann Thompson
 Mic Thompson
 Stacy Walker
 Michelle Weber
 Jason Yribar

Songs
The original orchestral score was composed by Nicholas Pike. In 2021 the soundtrack was released on the web from the non promotional CD.

The Michael Jackson songs are the following ones:
 "2 Bad" (film version)
 Taken from HIStory: Past, Present and Future, Book I
 "Is It Scary" (film version)*
 Taken from Blood on the Dance Floor: HIStory in the Mix
 "Ghosts"
 Taken from Blood on the Dance Floor: HIStory in the Mix

Release
Ghosts was screened out of competition at the 1997 Cannes Film Festival. At over 38 minutes long, it held the Guinness world record for the longest music video until 2013, when it was eclipsed by Pharrell Williams' "Happy". In 2020, the film was available on Jackson’s YouTube channel from October 29 to November 1.

In December 1997, towards the end of promotion for Michael Jackson's remix album Blood on the Dance Floor, a Deluxe Collector Box Set of Ghosts was released only in Europe. The box set included a VHS release of Jackson's Ghosts mini-movie on home video and his Blood on the Dance Floor album on CD, as well as a CD maxi single named the Limited Edition Minimax CD. "On the Line" was the first track on this single.

Reception 
The AV Club writer Nathan Rabin described it as a "staggeringly blunt" allegory for Jackson's life and pop culture status; he described it as "clunky, leaden, and overblown". He attributed its failure to Jackson's place in the public imagination at the time, in light of Jackson's recent divorce from Lisa Marie Presley and the 1993 child molestation allegations against him.

On the Line

"On the Line" is a song co-written and produced by Babyface. Michael Jackson performs the track and is also credited in its writing (on the writing credits of The Ultimate Collection). It was originally recorded by Jackson for the Spike Lee movie Get on the Bus (1996), but it was not featured on the soundtrack.

The full-length version of the song was released on November 16, 2004 as an album track of his limited edition box set The Ultimate Collection.

Personnel
 Written and composed by Babyface and Michael Jackson
 Produced by Babyface
 Solo and background vocals by Michael Jackson

Track listing
Limited Edition Minimax CD (EPC 665268 2)
 "On the Line" (Short Version) – 4:37
 "Ghosts" (Mousse T's Radio Rock Singalong Remix) – 4:25
 "Is It Scary" (DJ Greek's Scary Mix) – 7:12

References

External links 

 

1996 films
1996 horror films
1996 short films
Films directed by Stan Winston
Films with screenplays by Stephen King
Films with screenplays by Michael Jackson
Films with screenplays by Mick Garris
Films scored by Nicholas Pike
African-American horror films
American independent films
American horror short films
American supernatural horror films
Allegory
1990s English-language films
1990s American films